Chris Molendorp (born July 5, 1969) is an American politician who served in the Missouri House of Representatives from 2009 to 2015.

References

1969 births
Living people
Republican Party members of the Missouri House of Representatives